Shodug is a town in Thimphu District in western Bhutan.

References

External links
Satellite map at Maplandia.com

Populated places in Bhutan